Ephrat released their debut album No One's Words in September 2008, with guest stars Daniel Gildenlöw (Pain of Salvation) and Petronella Nettermalm (Paatos).
The album was mixed and mastered by Steven Wilson (Porcupine Tree).

Ephrat performed a 40 minutes set as an opening act for Dream Theater in their first appearance in Israel on June 16, 2009, in front of 12,000 people. The act included the songs "The Show", "Better than Anything", "Blocked" and "Real" from the album No One’s Words.

Line up
Omer Ephrat: Keyboards, Flute, guitars
Lior Seker: lead vocals
Gili Rosenberg: bass
Tomer Z: Drums

Discography
 No One’s Words - Studio Album, September 2008

References

External links
Ephrat Myspace Site

Israeli progressive metal musical groups
Inside Out Music artists